MacKenzie Entwistle (born July 14, 1999) is a Canadian professional ice hockey player currently playing for the  Chicago Blackhawks of the National Hockey League (NHL). He was selected by the Arizona Coyotes in the third-round, 69th overall, of the 2017 NHL Entry Draft.

Early life
Entwistle was born on July 14, 1999, in Georgetown, Ontario to parents Margeret and Dave Entwistle. Both of his parents were athletes growing up; his mother played volleyball while his father represented Ontario in rugby. As his father Dave is of English descent, he grew up playing soccer as well as lacrosse and ice hockey.

Playing career
Entwistle played major junior hockey in the Ontario Hockey League for the Guelph Storm and Hamilton Bulldogs.

Drafted by the Arizona Coyotes in 2017, he was acquired by the Chicago Blackhawks along with Marcus Kruger, Jordan Maletta, Andrew Campbell and a fifth-round pick in 2019 to a trade on July 12, 2018, in exchange for Marian Hossa, Vinnie Hinostroza, Jordan Oesterle and a third-round pick. He was signed to a three-year, entry-level contract with the Blackhawks on October 17, 2018.

Career statistics

Regular season and playoffs

International

References

External links

1999 births
Arizona Coyotes draft picks
Canadian ice hockey right wingers
Chicago Blackhawks players
Guelph Storm players
Hamilton Bulldogs (AHL) players
Ice hockey people from Ontario
Living people
People from Halton Hills
Rockford IceHogs (AHL) players